Marylebone Cricket Club (MCC) toured Bangladesh in January 2000 and played five matches including one first-class against the Bangladesh national team which was elevated to Test status later in the year, having been granted full membership of the International Cricket Conference (the ICC). The first-class match was drawn. MCC were captained by Min Patel and Bangladesh by Aminul Islam.

References

2000 in English cricket
2000 in Bangladeshi cricket
Bangladesh 1999–2000
International cricket competitions from 1997–98 to 2000
Bangladeshi cricket seasons from 1971–72 to 2000
Bangladesh 1999–2000